(stylized Johnny's WEST) is a boyband consisting of seven members formed under the Johnny & Associates talent agency. The members are Daiki Shigeoka, Junta Nakama, Takahiro Hamada, Akito Kiriyama, Tomohiro Kamiyama, Ryusei Fujii, and Nozomu Kotaki. The group's name comes from the fact that it originated within the Johnny & Associates talent agency and that the members are from Kansai, the west region of Japan. They are the first group from Kansai Johnny's Jr. that has debuted in ten years, the last being Kanjani Eight. They debuted in 2014 with the single, "."

Members 
Created based on the official website profile and sorted after birthdays. The member colors are used in costumes, CDs, albums, DVDs jackets, and TV shows.

History

Debut 
At the 2013-2014 Johnny's Countdown Live held at Tokyo Dome from December 31, 2013, to January 1, 2014, the four members, Daiki Shigeoka, Junta Nakama, Akito Kiriyama, and Nozomu Kotaki announced the group's debut and the debut CD. It was a sudden announcement that the four members got the approval from Johnny Kitagawa, the president of the agency, and decided to announce 30 minutes before the appearance on the stage. Initially, the group's name was supposed to be Johnny's WEST 4. However, they later found that having the number "4" in their name was inappropriate due to the Japanese superstition that the number was unlucky. Therefore, they changed to the name "Johnny's WEST." The four members directly asked Johnny Kitagawa to add three more members, namely, Takahiro Hamada, Tomohiro Kamiyama, and Ryusei Fujii. After getting his approval, Johnny's WEST became a seven-member group.

Their first leading play, "," was held at the Nissay Theatre from February 5 to 28, 2014. At the rehearsal on February 5, the first day of the play, Takahiro Hamada, Tomohiro Kamiyama, and Ryusei Fujii joined as new members and announced that seven members would debut as Johnny's WEST. It was also revealed that initial four members persuaded Johnny Kitagawa to let the other three join the group. In the performances that followed, the group revealed that the group evolved from having four members to seven members.

The debut single, "," was released on April 23, 2014.

Story of Pre-debut 
In an interview with Myōjō (Shueisha) after their debut, they revealed the circumstances until their debut. During the appearance of the play "ANOTHER," in which six members other than Fujii appeared in September 2013, it was informed by the staff of Johnny & Associates that they would debut as seven members, including Hamada, Kamiyama, and Fujii. After that, the members had a meeting about their group's name and debut song, and they thought it would be unveiled at "Johnny's Count Down Live," held on December 31, 2013. However, shortly before the concert, the Johnny & Associates told them that they would appear at the concert as Kansai Johnny's Jr., and then all of them were told that they had no longer appeared.

After the situation changed repeatedly, they were informed that they would actually be at the concert, so they needed to go to Tokyo from Osaka. However, only four members, Shigeoka, Nakama, Kiriyama, and Kotaki, were boarded the Shinkansen. During the meeting in Tokyo, Nakama asked the staff why they were gathered without the other three members, and the staff told that they would debut as a group of four members. They told the other three members about the debut a few hours before the Countdown Concert started. Although they appeared in the concert afterward, the four members were not in the mood to smile at all during the performance. Immediately after, during the Kansai Johnny's Jr. concert held on January 4, 2014, the four members could not even meet the other three members because of the debut, and Nakama stated in the interview, "It was like hell."

The four members continued to ask for the debut with the other three members, and they were finally able to debut as a group of seven members. Shigeoka mainly asked about the debut, and several members answered, "It was Shigeoka. He did not give up from the beginning." Regarding this matter, Shigeoka responded, "I accepted it once when I was told that we would debut with four people, but I could not give up my hope. I desired to include the three members who were not involved initially, but that reason was not enough. I wanted the group to be nationally famous, so I believed that three members were absolutely essential for that."

Career

2014 

 At the 2013-2014 Johnny's Countdown Live held at Tokyo Dome from December 31, 2013, to January 1, 2014, the four members, Daiki Shigeoka, Junta Nakama, Akito Kiriyama, and Nozomu Kotaki announced the group's debut and the debut CD.
 On February 5, their first leading play, "," was held at the Nissay Theatre. At the rehearsal on the same day, Takahiro Hamada, Tomohiro Kamiyama, and Ryusei Fujii joined as new members and announced that seven members would debut as Johnny's WEST. This day is said to be the formation day of Johnny's WEST.
 On April 2, it was decided that Akito Kiriyama served as MC with Fumito Kawai from A.B.C-Z at "Shounen Club," which Johnny's WEST appeared regularly.
 On April 20, Johnny's WEST had a press conference of debut at Abeno Harukas. After that, they moved to the heliport on the rooftop, 300 m (984 ft) above the ground, and performed their debut song, "Eejanaika."
 On April 23, Johnny's WEST debuted with the release of their 1st single, "."
 From April 26 to May 6, the performance, "," which was planned to commemorate the CD debut of Johnny's WEST, was held at Osaka Shochikuza.
 On April 27, Johnny's WEST held a handshake event at Intex Osaka.
 On April 30, a serial blog of "" was started on Johnny's web, updated weekly by one of the members.
 From May 11 to 21, the event, "," started at Shinbashi Enbujō.
 On May 14, it was announced at the MC of the same event above that the serialization of "Na-Ni-Wa-Bu-Shi!" would be updated every week by every member.
 On July 22 and 23, "" was held at Zepp Namba Osaka, and on July 28 and 29 at Zepp Diver City Tokyo.
 On August 2, the play, "," started at Osaka Shochikuza.
 On August 6, the 1st studio album, "," was released.
 On August 28 and 29, a commemorative party for the release of the 1st album, "Go West Yōi Don!," was held at Yokohama Arena.
 On September 3, the play, "Typhoon n Dreamer," started at the Nissay Theatre. 
 On October 8, the 2nd single, "," was released.
 On December 17, the 1st DVD & Blu-ray, "Naniwa Samurai Hello Tokyo!!," was released.

2015 

 From January 2 to 6, the 1st concert, "," was held at Yokohama Arena and Osaka Castle Hall.
 On January 10, the play, "," started at Nissay Theatre.
 On February 4, the 3rd single, "," was released.
 On April 22, Extended Album, "," was released.
 From May 4 to June 7, the 1st tour, "," was held at Yokohama Arena, Nagoya International Exhibition Hall, Osaka Castle Hall, Hiroshima City Cultural Exchange Hall, Fukuoka Sunpalace, and Kobe World Memorial Hall.
 On June 17, the 2nd DVD & Blu-ray, "Naniwa Tomoare, Honmani Arigatou!," was released.
 On July 29, the 4th single, "," was released.
 On October 7, the 3rd DVD & Blu-ray, "Johnny's WEST 1st Concert Ippatsumeeeeeee!," was released.
 On December 9, the 2nd studio album, "," was released.

2016 

 From January 3 to April 3, the tour, "," was held at Osaka Castle Hall, Yokohama Arena, Nippon Gaishi Hall, Hiroshima Prefectural Sports Center, Fukuoka Convention Center, Toki Messe, and Sekisui Heim Super Arena.
 On April 20, the 5th single, "," was released. It was used as the opening of the Ace Attorney anime.
 On May 18, 4th DVD & Blu-ray, "Johnny's WEST 1st Tour Paripipo," was released.
 On July 24, Johnny's WEST's official fan club was established.
 On July 27, the 6th single, "," was released.
 On September 27, it was announced that Johnny's WEST's first dome performance would be held at Kyocera Dome Osaka on December 24 and 25.
 On October 19, Johnny's Entertainment, a record company, opened a Twitter account to promote the album "".
 On November 30, the 3rd studio album, "Nawest," and the 5th DVD & Blu-ray, "Johnny's WEST Concert Tour 2016 Luckyyyyyyy7," were released.
 On December 24 and 25, the 1st concert at domed stadium, "," was held at Kyocera Dome Osaka.

2017 

 From January 3 to May7, the tour, "," was held at Yokohama Arena, Sun Dome Fukui, Fukuoka Convention Center, Sekisui Heim Super Arena, Nippon Gaishi Hall, Ecopa Arena, Osaka Castle Hall, Hokkaido Prefectural Sports Center, and Hiroshima Prefectural Sports Center.
 On March 25, it was announced that Johnny's WEST would appear in Netflix TV show, "Honō no Tenkōsei."
 On April 23, Shigeoka announced that the serialization of "Na-Ni-Wa-Bu-Shi!" would be updated once every two days.
 On May 24, the 6th DVD & Blu-ray, "Johnny's WEST 1st Dome Live 24-kara Kansha Todokemasu," was released.
 On June 21, the 7th single, "," was released.
 On October 25, the 7th DVD & Blu-ray, "Johnny's WEST Live Tour 2017 Nawest," was released.
 On November 10, "Honō no Tenkōsei REBORN" was started broadcasting on Netflix.
 On November 22, the 8th single, "," was released.

2018 

 On January 2, the 4th studio album "WESTival" was released.
 From January 3 to May 20, the tour, "Johnny's WEST Live Tour 2018 WESTival," was held at Yokohama Arena, Fukuoka Convention Center, Ecopa Arena, Nippon Gaishi Hall, Kobe World Memorial Hall, Sekisui Heim Super Arena, Toki Messe, Osaka Castle Hall, Hiroshima Prefectural Sports Center, and Hokkaido Prefectural Sports Center.
 On May 7, the 9th single, "" was released.
 On August 15, the 10th single, "," was released. It became first opening single from Captain Tsubasa (2018) by David Production.
 On October 24, the 8th DVD & Blu-ray, "Johnny's WEST Live Tour 2018 WESTival," was released.
 On December 5, the 5th studio album, "WESTV!," was released.

2019 

 From January 3 to March 24, the tour, "Johnny's WEST Live Tour 2019 WESTV!," was held at Yokohama Arena, Nippon Gaishi Hall, Toki Messe, Fukuoka Convention Center, Osaka Castle Hall, Sekisui Heim Super Arena, Kobe World Memorial Hall, and Hokkaido Prefectural Sports Center.
 On January 30, the 11th single, "," was released. Kizudarakeno Ai became second opening single from Captain Tsubasa.
 On April 24, the 12th single, "," was released.
 On May 29, DVD & Blu-ray, "Honō no Tenkōsei REBORN," was released.
 On June 1, due to the termination of the business of Johnny's Entertainment Co., Ltd., which was Johnny's WEST's label, they transferred to the label "Johnny's Entertainment Record" of J Storm Co., Ltd.
 On July 10, the 9th DVD & Blu-ray, "Johnny's WEST Live Tour 2019 WESTV!," was released.
 On July 25, Johnny's WEST was appointed as a tournament special supporter for 2019 FIVB Volleyball Women's World Cup (opening on September 14). They were the first time the group had been a special supporter since the debut.
 On October 9, the 13th single, "Big Shot!!," was released.

2020 

 On March 18, the 6th studio album "W trouble" was released.
 From March 29 to May 24, the tour "Johnny's WEST Live Tour 2020 W trouble" was supposed to be held at Fukuoka Convention Center, Makomanai Ice Arena, Sekisui Heim Super Arena, Toki Messe, Osaka Castle Hall, Saitama Super Arena, and Ecopa Arena. However, all the concerts were canceled due to the COVID-19 pandemic. Afterward, the concerts were rescheduled and planned to be held at the same venues, but those were canceled again since Johnny & Associates announced that they would refrain from large-scale concerts until the end of 2020.
 On May 13, it was announced that a limited-time unit "Twenty★Twenty" of 75 artists from the Johnny & Associates talent agency, including members of Johnny's WEST, was formed as part of the  "Smile Up! Project," a support activity to prevent the spread of COVID-19.
 On June 24, the 14th single, "," was released.
 On July 28, the online streaming event, "Johnny's DREAM IsLAND 2020→2025 ~Daisuki na Kono Machi Kara~," was held at Expo Commemoration Park with Kanjani Eight and Kansai Johnny's Jr.
 On August 1, Johnny's WEST performance of "Johnny's DREAM ISLAND 2020→2025 ~Daisuki na Kono Machi Kara~" was performed at Osaka Shochikuza.
 From December 11 to 13, the tour, "Johnny's WEST Live Tour 2020 W trouble," which had been postponed to prevent the spread of COVID-19, was held online.

2021 

 On January 13, the 15th single, "," was released.
 On March 17, the 7th studio album, "rainboW," was released.
 From April 3 to June 20, the tour, "Johnny's WEST Live Tour 2021 rainboW," was held at Makomanai Ice Arena, Sekisui Heim Super Arena, Nippon Gaishi Hall, Toki Messe, Saitama Super Arena, and Grand Messe Kumamoto. A concert at Osaka Castle Hall was canceled due to quasi-emergency due to the COVID-19 pandemic.
 On May 5, the 16th single, "," was released.
 On July 28, the 17th single, "," was released.
 On October 6, the 10th DVD & Blu-ray, "Johnny's WEST Live Tour 2020 W trouble," was released.

2022 

 On January 19, the 18th single, "," was released.
 On March 9, the 8th studio album, "Mixed Juice," will be released.
 From March 20 to June 12, the tour, "Johnny's WEST Live Tour 2022 Mixed Juice," will be held at Ecopa Arena, Grand Messe Kumamoto, Sekisui Heim Super Arena, Nippon Gaishi Hall, Osaka Municipal Central Gymnasium, Pia Arena MM, Osaka Castle Hall, Toki Messe, and Makomanai Ice Arena.

Discography

Studio albums

Extended plays

Singles

DVDs

Media appearances 
Listed only appearances as a group.

Variety shows 
They had only appeared on VTRs, but from the broadcast on July 29, 2015, two members from Johnny's WEST randomly appeared in the studio and were in charge of the segment of "3 Tack No.1."

 was broadcast on August 9, 2014, December 30, 2014, and November 10, 2015, on Mainichi Broadcasting System.

 was broadcast from October 8, 2014, to June 24, 2015, on TV Tokyo. Johnny's WEST was in charge of MC with Hey! Say! JUMP on a weekly basis. The title was changed to "Little Tokyo Life" and was broadcast from July 1, 2015, to September 25, 2019.

 is a series program on Kansai Telecasting Corporation in which Johnny's WEST takes on challenges and adventures all over Japan. The first episode was held in Okinawa and broadcast on September 13, 2014. The second episode was held in Hokkaido and broadcast on March 22, 2015. The third episode was held in Shikoku and broadcast on February 12, 2017. The fourth episode was held in Kita Kantō and broadcast on September 17, 2017. The fifth episode was held in Kyushu and broadcast on August 18, 2019. The sixth episode was held in Shikoku again and broadcast on October 18, 2020. The seventh episode was held in Tōhoku and broadcast on January 29, 2022.

Johnny's West was on the Doyoru series.  was broadcast from July 11 to October 10, 2015, on Asahi Television Broadcasting System.  was broadcast from October 24, 2015, to January 9, 2016.  was broadcast from January 16 to March 26, 2016.  was broadcast from April 9 to September 24, 2016.

 was broadcast from October 22, 2016, to October 19, 2018, on Mainichi Broadcasting System.

 was streamed on Paravi from April 26, 2019, to April 10, 2020. It is started broadcasting on TBS Television (Japan) every Tuesday since June 30, 2020.

 was broadcast on September 14, 2019, on Fuji TV.

 is started broadcasting from October 4, 2020, on Asahi Television Broadcasting System. It was broadcast every Saturday only in Kansai region until September 9, 2021. It is broadcasting every Sunday in every region in Japan.

Johnny's WEST was invited to the shows  as a monthly guest from May 7 to 28, 2021.

TV dramas 
Honō no Tenkōsei Reborn started broadcasting on Netflix on November 10, 2017.

Radio shows 
 was broadcast from April 4, 2014, to September 24, 2021, on Asahi Radio Broadcasting Corporation.

 is started broadcasting on April 7, 2007, on Radio Kansai.

 is started in April 2014, in Bay FM (Japan).

Johnny's WEST no All Night Nippon Premium was broadcast on June 13, 2020, on Nippon Broadcasting System.

TV commercials 

 Baskin-Robbins
 Poppin Shower ☆ Pachikyan MAX (April, 2016)
 Manatsu no Yukidaruma Daisakusen (July, 2016)
 Challenge the Triple (June, 2017)
 Manatsu no Yukidaruma Daisakusen (July, 2017)
 FamilyMart
 Honō no Gourmet Fair (November, 2017)

Tour / Concerts

Notes

References

External links
 Official website
(English) Johnny's net Official website

Japanese boy bands
Japanese pop music groups
Japanese idol groups
Johnny & Associates